Fire Bomber is a fictional rock band from the anime series Macross 7 (and related projects such as Macross 7 Trash, Macross 7 Encore, and Macross Dynamite 7). In real life, Fire Bomber's music was performed by Yoshiki Fukuyama (the singing voice and guitar of Basara), Chie Kajiura (the singing voice of Mylene), and occasionally by Tomo Sakurai (the acting spokesperson of Mylene).

In the second Macross Frontier movie, Ranka Lee and other SMS members acted as the cover band of Fire Bomber (titled "Lovely Bomber") as part of a diversion to free Sheryl Nome from prison. In the fictional world of Macross, Fire Bomber was pivotal in defeating the alien Protodeviln after discovering that their music was the only thing capable of affecting them. Three of their songs were also featured in the 2008 series Macross Frontier, as S.M.S. Skull Leader Ozma Lee is a fan of the band.

Fictional line-up
 Basara Nekki – Lead vocals, guitar
 Mylene Flare Jenius – Bass, co-lead vocals
 Ray Lovelock – Keytar
 Veffidas Feaze – Drums

Real line-up
Vocals – Yoshiki Fukuyama and Nobutoshi Hayashi (Basara Nekki)
Vocals – Chie Kajiura and Tomo Sakurai (Mylene Jenius)
Bass – Yukio Sugi
Drums – Kazuo Sitay
Guitars – Yoshiki Fukuyama
Guitars – Haruhiko Mera
Guitars – Masaki Suzuki
Keyboards – Seiji Tanaka

Discography

 LET'S FIRE!!. The first Macross 7/Fire Bomber album was released. It contains the tracks played in the first half of the TV series in more or less the order in which they appear in the episodes. 
 SECOND FIRE!. The second Fire Bomber CD. Contains the songs played in the second half of the series, including the two "Let's Bomber!" video songs. 
 DYNAMITE FIRE!! The Dynamite OVA song album. Songs are in more or less the order in which they appear in the series, though there are several that are never sung in the OVA at all. 
 RADIO FIRE!!. This CD contains the complete radio program from all the radio broadcasts from Elma's radio and the Zola public radio in the Dynamite OVA. Most of the tracks on this CD are drama tracks. There are also different versions of Fire Bomber songs and songs by other artists. 
 LIVE FIRE!! (1995). A recording CD of Fire Bomber live in concert. The tracks are mostly sung by the voice actor of Basara (Hayashi Nobutoushi) and Mylene (Sakurai Tomo), not their singing voices from the anime.  
 KARA-OK FIRE!!. Karaoke album of most of the songs that appear in the TV series. Contains duet and guitar karaoke bonus tracks at the end for Planet Dance. 
 ACOUSTIC FIRE!! The songs on this acoustic album are not quite the acoustic versions found in the anime itself. There's more instrumentation, though little enough to be called "acoustic." The album also has a more "country American" feel to it, since it was recorded in the USA. 
 ULTRA FIRE!! "Best of" Fire Bomber album. 
 GALAXY NETWORK CHART 1. A "real" Macross universe album containing tracks from what is probably a single week of the Galaxy Network Chart's top 10 ratings of bands from all over the galaxy. Note that Fire Bomber has five of the ten spots. 
 GALAXY NETWORK CHART 2 As above. 
 MYLENE JENIUS SINGS LYNN MINMAY (1995) Two female vocalists of Macross join forces in this album. Mylene sings Minmay's most famous songs including Ai Oboeteimasu ka? (Do You Remember Love?), the version of which appears in Fleet of the Strongest Women. The singer is not Chie Kajiura, Mylene's series singing voice, but is instead her voice actress Sakurai Tomo.  
 ENGLISH FIRE. All the songs on this album have been redone in English by the band Fire Bomber American. Instead of simply being English versions of Fire Bomber songs, the makers of Macross have created an English version of the band Fire Bomber. In the Macross universe, Fire Bomber American is a band on the English-speaking fleet Macross 11 that claims that the Macross 7 Fire Bomber is a rip-off of it. The singers for this band are also different. According to the fictional Macross continuity Lynn Kaifun, a character from the first TV series from 1982 (who was Lynn Minmay's cousin and also her former manager) is the creator and manager of Fire Bomber American.
 BEST COLLECTION (not an official release) 
 OTHER FIRE!! (not an official release)
 MEMORIAL CD (not an official release)
 SEVENTH MOON SINGLE 
 MY FRIENDS SINGLE 
 HEART AND SOUL SINGLE  
 DYNAMITE EXPLOSION SINGLE 
 FUKUYAMA FIRE. On May 24, 2005, 10 years after Macross 7 aired in Japan, Yoshiki Fukuyama (singing voice for Basara) released a tribute album (Fukuyama Fire - A Tribute To Nekki Basara) in which he sings the most popular Macross 7 songs with new arrangements plus a new song.
Tracklist:
 Holy Lonely Light
 New Frontier
 totsugeki Love Heart
 Dynamite Explosion (live version)
 Remember 16
 yume no michi(live version)
 Submarine Street
 Planet Dance
 Light the Light
 na mo na ki hate no machi de
 Heart & Soul
 Starlight Dream (live version)
 Angel Voice
 Like A Fire (new song)
 RE.FIRE. Fifteen years after Macross 7 first aired in Japan, Fire Bomber released its newest album, "RE.FIRE" in Japan on October 14, 2009. This new album brings 10 newly made songs, and two new versions of the hit songs "Love It" and "Totsugeki Love Heart".
 Bullet Soul
 Burning Fire
 Daemon
 Love It (2060A.D version)
 Big bang
 Ready Go
 Song of Eternity
 Stardust Highway
 Plastics
 Totsugeki Love Heart(2060A.D version)
 Magic Rhapsody
 Waiting For You

Songs

References

Macross characters
Animated musical groups